Hyridella is a genus of bivalves belonging to the family Hyriidae.

The species of this genus are found in Australia.

Species:

Hyridella australis 
Hyridella depressa 
Hyridella drapeta 
Hyridella glenelgensis 
Hyridella guppyi 
Hyridella misoolensis 
Hyridella narracanensis

References

Hyriidae
Bivalve genera